Bhuvan,  (lit: Earth), is an Indian web based utility which allows users to explore a set of map based content prepared by Indian Space Research Organisation. The content which the utility serves is mostly restricted to Indian boundaries and is offered in 4 regional languages. The content includes thematic maps related to disasters, agriculture, water resources, land cover and also processed satellite data of ISRO.  Bhuvan is known for its association with various sections of Government of India to enable the use of Geospatial technology. Bhuvan has since its inception enabled Indian government to host public geospatial data as Information layers for visualisation and public consumption. Examples of the types of geospatial layers include Toll Information System for National Highways Authority of India , Islands information System for MHA, Cultural heritage sites for Ministry of culture etc. The information for the platform is obtained from the government of India sources or through Crowdsourcing.

Overview 
ISRO launched the beta version of its web-based GIS tool, Bhuvan, on August 12, 2009. Bhuvan offers detailed imagery of Indian locations compared to other Virtual Globe Software, with spatial resolutions ranging up to 1 metre. At present 177 cities High resolution datasets are available, while the other part of the country is covered by 2.5m resolution imagery. The images available do not include any military installations in India, due to security concerns.

The National Remote Sensing Agency played an important role in the development of this product. ISRO has used data provided by satellites including Resourcesat-1, Cartosat-1 and Cartosat-2 to get the best possible imagery of India.

Improvement 
Since the launch of Bhuvan, users have experienced various difficulties. One problem is that the Bhuvan site has, at various times, been either inaccessible or very slow (due to less band width and servers). But now with new website Bhuvan portal is fast and responsive. also NSRC created BhuvanLite for faster expirence and also launch Bhuvan Wiki. Bhuvan wiki is a web application designed for publishing information and engaging Bhuvan users for sharing and contributing their knowledge to other users. It is useful to all Bhuvan users in finding topics of their interest to explore. It provides information on users interest and helps to better connect with the users.
However now Bhuvan is improving and does not require Login to visualize the maps. Users need to register only when they wish to download satellite data (up to 25m resolution LISS-III data) and products (like NDVI, OHC datasets, Cartosat Digital Elevation Model etc.)
To overcome the Plugin restrictions and platform-dependency for 3D -visualization, Bhuvan has come with a WebGL based open-source virtual globe. It only requires WebGL enabled browsers.

Since the initial, buggy beta release, a more stable version has been released, with which users have reported fewer problems. A discussion forum has also been started for users experiencing difficulties.

See also
 Collaborative mapping
 WikiMapia
 Google Map Maker
 Geo-wiki
 OpenStreetMap

References

External links 
 Bhuvan website 
 NRSC Open Data Archive
 Bhuvan's Thematic Services
 Disaster Support Through Bhuvan
 Bhuvan Virtual Globe 
 Bhuvan's Map
 More Information About Bhuvan
 Bhuvan: OGC website of the month, December 2010
 Prime Minister's message

Virtual globes
Remote sensing software
Virtual reality
Space programme of India
Public-domain software
Satellite imagery
Web mapping